The Atlanta Phoenix is a women’s tackle football team of the Women's National Football Conference that began play in 2012.  Based in Atlanta, Georgia, the team plays its home games at Decatur High Stadium in Downtown Decatur, GA.

Season-By-Season

|-
|2012 || 8 || 2 || 0 || 1st National Southeast || Won National Conference Wild Card (Tallahassee)Lost National Conference Quarterfinal (Jacksonville)
|-
|2013 || 10 || 1 || 0 || 1st National Southeast || Won National Conference Wild Card (Tampa Bay)Won National Conference Quarterfinal (Miami)Lost National Conference Semifinal (Chicago)
|-
|2014 || 7 || 3 || 0 || 1st National Southeast || Won National Conference Wild Card (Tampa Bay)Lost National Conference Quarterfinal (Miami)
|-
|2015 || 6 || 5 || 0 || 2nd National North Atlantic || Won National Conference Quarterfinal (Jacksonville)Lost National Conference Semifinal (D.C.)Lost Alliance Bowl (Central Cal)
|-
|2016 || 5 || 4 || 0 || 5th National || Lost National Conference Quarterfinal (Pittsburgh)
|-
!Totals || 36 || 15 || 0 ||  ||

2012

Season schedule

References

 

Women's Football Alliance teams
Sports teams in Atlanta
American football teams in Georgia (U.S. state)
American football teams established in 2012
2012 establishments in Georgia (U.S. state)
Women's sports in Georgia (U.S. state)